Pitters is a surname. Notable people with the surname include:

Alfonso Pitters (born 1963), Panamanian sprinter
Shakan Pitters (born 1989), British boxer

See also
Pieters